Stockdorf station is a railway station in the district of Stockdorf, within the municipality of Gauting, in Bavaria, Germany. It is located on the Munich–Garmisch-Partenkirchen railway of Deutsche Bahn.

Services
 the following services stop at Stockdorf:

References

External links
 
 Stockdorf layout 
 

Railway stations in Bavaria
Buildings and structures in Starnberg (district)
Munich S-Bahn stations